Voroshnevo is a rural locality and the administrative center of Voroshnevsky Selsoviet Rural Settlement, Kursky District, Kursk Oblast, Russia. Population:

Geography 
The village is located on the Seym River (a left tributary of the Desna), 79 km from the Russia–Ukraine border, 11 km south-west of Kursk.

 Streets
There are the following streets in the locality: 453-454 km razyezd, Belinskogo, Gazoprovodskaya, Konoplyanka 1-ya, Konoplyanka 2-ya, Konoplyanka 3-ya, Masalova, Mirnaya, Olkhovskaya, Sadovaya, Shirokaya, Sosnovaya, Teplichnaya, Teplichnaya 2-ya and Vatutina (625 houses).

 Climate
Voroshnevo has a warm-summer humid continental climate (Dfb in the Köppen climate classification).

Transport 
Voroshnevo is located on the federal route  Crimea Highway (a part of the European route ), on the road of regional importance  (Kursk – Lgov – Rylsk – border with Ukraine), at the railway halt and passing loop 454 km (railway line Lgov I — Kursk).

The rural locality is situated 20 km from Kursk Vostochny Airport, 116 km from Belgorod International Airport and 220 km from Voronezh Peter the Great Airport.

References

Notes

Sources

Rural localities in Kursky District, Kursk Oblast